R Octantis, also known as HD 40857, is a solitary, red hued variable star located in the southern circumpolar constellation Octans. It has an apparent magnitude that varies in-between 6.4 and 13.2 within 405 days. At is maximum, it is barely visible to the naked eye.

R Octantis has been known to have a peculiar spectra since 1892. It was revealed to have emission lines in its spectrum in a 1954 paper and was found to be a long period variable a year later. In 1966, R Octantis was officially classified as a Mira variable. Later observations reveal it to have an overabundance of oxygen on its outer layers. 

The object has an average stellar classification of M5.5e, indicating that it is a M-type star with emission lines in its spectrum. However, this can range from M5.3 to M8.4e. It is currently on the asymptotic giant branch, generating energy by fusing hydrogen and helium shells around an inert carbon core. As a result, it has expanded to 466 times the radius of the Sun.

References

Mira variables
Octans
Octantis, R
Durchmusterung objects
040857
025412
Emission-line stars